Carles Marco Viñas (born September 23, 1974) is a Spanish retired basketball player, who played as point guard, and the current assistant coach for Crvena zvezda of the EuroLeague and the ABA League.

Professional career
Marco spent all his career in the two top divisions of the Spanish basketball, making his debut at Liga ACB in 1998 with Fórum Valladolid. He was selected to play the Liga ACB All Star Game in the 2000–01 and the 2002–03 seasons. He retired in 2009, after playing the second half of the 2008–09 LEB Oro season with Ford Burgos.

National team career
In August and September 2002, Marco was a member of the Spain national team that finished 5th at the FIBA World Championship in Indianapolis, U.S. Over eight tournament games, he averaged 4.9 points, 0.9 rebounds, and 1.9 assists per game. In September 2003, Marco was a member of the Spanish roster that won a silver medal at the FIBA European Championship in Sweden. Over six tournament games, he averaged 6.7 points, 1.5 rebounds, and 2.5 assists per game. In total, Marco played 34 matches for the national team.

Coaching career
Marco started his career as coach in 2011, as the assistant coach of Bàsquet Manresa of Liga ACB. Four seasons later, he signed with Unión Financiera Baloncesto Oviedo of the LEB Oro for his first experience as head coach. In May 2018, Oviedo and Carles Marco parted ways after three seasons qualifying for the promotion playoffs.

On 20 November 2022, Marco was appointed as an assistant coach for Crvena zvezda under Duško Ivanović.

National teams 
In July 2016, Marco was an assistant coach for the Spain national under-20 team that won a gold medal at the European Championship in Helsinki, Finland.

Career achievements 
As head coach:
 Copa Princesa de Asturias winner: 1 (with Oviedo: 2017)

Personal life
His father, is a Spanish actor.

References

External links 

 ACB Profile
 Profile at Spain national basketball team website

1974 births
Living people
People from Badalona
2002 FIBA World Championship players
Basketball players from Catalonia
Baloncesto León players
Basket Zaragoza players
Bàsquet Manresa players
Competitors at the 2001 Mediterranean Games
Real Betis Baloncesto players
CB Valladolid players
Gijón Baloncesto players
Joventut Badalona players
KK Crvena zvezda assistant coaches
Liga ACB players
Medalists at the 1999 Summer Universiade
Mediterranean Games gold medalists for Spain
Mediterranean Games medalists in basketball
Spanish expatriate basketball people in Serbia
Sportspeople from the Province of Barcelona
Point guards
Universiade medalists in basketball
Universiade bronze medalists for Spain